William Hardy Murfree (October 2, 1781 – January 19, 1827), born in Hertford County, North Carolina, was a member of the United States House of Representatives from North Carolina.

Education
He graduated in 1801 from the University of North Carolina at Chapel Hill  where he studied law.  He was admitted to the bar and practiced in Edenton, North Carolina.

Career
Murfee became a member of the North Carolina General Assembly in 1805 and 1812 and was elected as a Republican to the Thirteenth and Fourteenth Congresses where he served from March 4, 1813, to March 3, 1817.  He served as Chairman of the Committee on Public Expenditures in the Fourteenth Congress.

In 1823, he moved from Murfreesboro, North Carolina, to his estate in Williamson County, Tennessee where he died on January 19, 1827.  He was buried in Murfree Cemetery, northwest of Franklin, Tennessee. His home at Murfreesboro, North Carolina, Melrose, was listed on the National Register of Historic Places in 1971.

Sources

See also 
 Thirteenth United States Congress
 Fourteenth United States Congress

1781 births
1827 deaths
Members of the North Carolina House of Representatives
Members of the North Carolina Provincial Congresses
University of North Carolina at Chapel Hill alumni
Democratic-Republican Party members of the United States House of Representatives from North Carolina
19th-century American politicians
People from Hertford County, North Carolina
People from Edenton, North Carolina